Barreh Farakh (also Romanized as Barreh Farākh, Barah Farākh, and Bareh Farākh; also known as Barāfaraq and Barafra) is a village in Khezel-e Sharqi Rural District, Khezel District, Nahavand County, Hamadan Province, Iran. At the 2006 census, its population was 410, in 89 families.

References 

Populated places in Nahavand County